John Hopkins (born 1975) is an English actor. Some of his best-known roles include Sgt. Dan Scott on Midsomer Murders (2004–2005), Lowell in Tim Burton's Alice in Wonderland (2010), and Sir Francis Basset in the British TV series Poldark (2017–2018). In addition to his television and film work, Hopkins also acts on stage and does voiceovers for video games, television and radio.

Early life and education 
John Hopkins was born in Luton, England, a town close to London. There is little publicly available information about his family or childhood. He attended secondary school at Manshead CofE Upper School in Dunstable, Bedfordshire, and later studied at the University of Leeds (1993-1996), majoring in English. After this, Hopkins started to show interest in the theatre. He joined a drama group and took part in various productions.

Hopkins received a Sunday Times Short Story Award for student-actors for his role in A Short Play About Sex and Death. After graduation from the University of Leeds, he attended the Royal Academy of Dramatic Art (1997-2000). He was noticed by the Royal Shakespeare Company and had his first repertory season there (2001-2002). That was the beginning of his professional acting career.

Career
Around 2002, Hopkins began receiving offers for television roles. Some of the first were minor parts in Trial and Retribution 7 and Love in a Cold Climate. After those, he accepted an offer to play the role of Detective Sergeant Dan Scott in the British television series Midsomer Murders. His involvement with the show continued from the beginning of the 7th series (2004) to the end of the 8th series. Hopkins' character was conceived as a "ladies' man" because of his appearance. During this time, John Nettles was playing the lead role of "Barnaby". Because the actors shared the same first name, Hopkins was assigned the nickname "Hoppers". The two formed a friendship while working together. From 2004 to 2005, Hopkins left the show, returning to the Royal Shakespeare Company to participate in the 2006-2007 London and Stratford-upon-Avon season. At that time, he played Caesar opposite Patrick Stewart in Antony and Cleopatra. He also appeared in Patrick Barlow's comedic version of The 39 Steps as Richard Hannay, as Richard I at the Shakespeare's Globe in the Holy Warriors, and as Benedick in Much Ado About Nothing. He has also continued to work in television; his credits there include Stan Lee's Lucky Man and the BBC drama Poldark as Sir Francis Basset. Billington in 2018 for The Guardian referred to Hopkins as "one of our best Shakespearean actors", and he was named one of "10 best British actors on stage now" in The Times article by Dominic Maxwell.

Interview for the Midsomer Murders Society 
Hopkins thinks that the whole concept of the Midsomer Murders series is based on the idea of presenting serenity in an issued society. He considers that show is crucial for almost everyone because it demonstrates how all the problems can be solved, where good wins over evil, and everyone returns to the ordinary life once all is done. Hopkins joined the television show when it already had vast popularity. Therefore, as he states, "a bit more pressure was on me than the other guys". Hopkins describes his character as a person who is unwelcoming towards the countryside. He prefers city life and always looks for the method to escape but never achieves it. The relationship between Sergeant Dan Scott (Hopkins' role) and Detective chief inspector (DCI) Barnaby (John Nettles' role) was tense at the beginning, but eventually became smoother, despite Barnaby's disapproval of Scott's ways. The character Scott and the actor Hopkins have quite different attitudes towards country life; Hopkins feels delighted about spending time in the country. Midsomer Murders allowed him to get to know other great British actors including Diana Quick and Steve Redgrave. While filming the show, Hopkins got a chance to participate in a movie made by his friends in Prague. His character was a man who woke up in Prague with amnesia. He said he enjoyed playing an "action hero".

Interview on Christmas and The Festive Episode 
Hopkins stated that he enjoys getting away on Christmas holidays to the Lake District, Peak District or Wales. He and his friends climb mountains between Boxing Day and New Year's Eve. Those days remind him of childhood. Before the trip, Hopkins visits his family. Together they eat and watch Midsomer Murders, and recount stories from the past. However, one Christmas he had to spend shooting for the TV show. The shooting was in an old abandoned house which was reputed to be haunted. Hopkins recalled wondering what story was behind the house and the atmosphere it created by sudden sounds and changes in temperature. Hopkins mentioned in the interview that he gained some weight during the winter episodes.

Filmography

Film

Television

Theatre

Video games

Audio

Awards 
Hopkins has been nominated for several awards during his career. He received two nominations for his voice in the video game Horizon Zero Dawn (2017) for the voiceover of "Erend".

References

External links
 

Alumni of RADA
English male film actors
English male stage actors
English male television actors
Living people
Male actors from London
Date of birth missing (living people)
1974 births